In Basque mythology, Gaizkiñ was an evil spirit that caused disease.

References 

Basque and Iberian deities
Basque mythology